Mudan (牡丹) may refer to:

 Paeonia rockii, or Rock's peony, woody species of peony, known as 紫斑牡丹 in Chinese.
 Paeonia suffruticosa, or tree peony, known as 牡丹 in Chinese.

People's Republic of China
 Mudan District, Heze, Shandong
 Mudan River, in Heilongjiang

Republic of China (Taiwan)
 Mudan, Pingtung, township in Pingtung, Taiwan
 Mudan Station, railway station of the Taiwan Railway Administration (TRA) Yilan Line, located in New Taipei

See also
 Mudan Auto, a Chinese bus manufacturer